Euryarchaeota (from Ancient Greek εὐρύς eurús, "broad, wide") is a phylum of archaea. Euryarchaeota are highly diverse and include methanogens, which produce methane and are often found in intestines, halobacteria, which survive extreme concentrations of salt, and some extremely thermophilic aerobes and anaerobes, which generally live at temperatures between 41 and 122 °C. They are separated from the other archaeans based mainly on rRNA sequences and their unique DNA polymerase.

Description
The Euryarchaeota are diverse in appearance and metabolic properties. The phylum contains organisms of a variety of shapes, including both rods and cocci. Euryarchaeota may appear either gram-positive or gram-negative depending on whether pseudomurein is present in the cell wall. Euryarchaeota also demonstrate diverse lifestyles, including methanogens, halophiles, sulfate-reducers, and extreme thermophiles in each. Others live in the ocean, suspended with plankton and bacteria. Although these marine euryarchaeota are difficult to culture and study in a lab, genomic sequencing suggests that they are motile heterotrophs.

Though it was previously thought that euryarchaeota only lived in extreme environments (in terms of temperature, salt content and/or pH), a paper by Korzhenkov et al published in January 2019 showed that euryarchaeota also live in moderate environments, such as low-temperature acidic environments. In some cases, euryarchaeota outnumbered the bacteria present. Euryarchaeota have also been found in other moderate environments such as water springs, marshlands, soil and rhizospheres. Some euryarchaeota are highly adaptable; an order called Halobacteriales are usually found in extremely salty and sulfur-rich environments but can also grow in salt concentrations as low as that of seawater 2.5%. In rhizospheres, the presence of euryarchaeota seems to be dependent on that of mycorrhizal fungi; a higher fungal population was correlated with higher euryarchaeotal frequency and diversity, while absence of mycorrihizal fungi was correlated with absence of euryarchaeota.

Phylogeny
The currently accepted taxonomy is based on the List of Prokaryotic names with Standing in Nomenclature (LPSN) and National Center for Biotechnology Information (NCBI)

A third phylogeny, 53 marker proteins based GTDB 07-RS207.

See also
 Archaeal Richmond Mine acidophilic nanoorganisms (ARMAN)
 Monera

References

Further reading

External links

 Comparative Analysis of Euryarchaeota Genomes (at DOE's IMG system)`1

 
Archaea phyla